Gnathoenia zonifera is a species of beetle in the family Cerambycidae. It was described by Harold in 1879. It is known from Angola.

References

Endemic fauna of Angola
Ceroplesini
Beetles described in 1879